Densley is a surname. Notable people with the surname include:

Gentry Densley, American singer, guitarist and composer
James Densley (born 1982), British-American sociologist
Les Densley (1894–1974), farmer and politician in South Australia
Peter Densley (born 1964), former Australian rules footballer

See also
25670 Densley, minor planet discovered January 4, 2000
Deley
Ensley (disambiguation)